James Steacy (born 29 May 1984 in Saskatoon, Saskatchewan) is a male hammer thrower from Canada. His personal best of 79.13 metres, achieved in May 2008 in Lethbridge, Alberta, stands as the current Canadian record. He represented Canada at the 2008 and 2012 Summer Olympics. With a top 12 finish at the 2008 Summer Olympics, he became the first Canadian in 84 years to reach the Olympic hammer throw final. Competing for University of Lethbridge, he is a five time CIS national champion in the weight throw and is the current CIS record holder in the event. He is the older brother of Canadian hammer thrower Heather Steacy.
He currently serves as a police officer for Lethbridge Police Service, in Lethbridge, Alberta.

Achievements

See also
 Canadian records in track and field

References

External links
 Official website
 
 
 James Steacy at All-Athletics.com
 
 

1984 births
Living people
Canadian male hammer throwers
Athletes (track and field) at the 2008 Summer Olympics
Athletes (track and field) at the 2012 Summer Olympics
Olympic track and field athletes of Canada
Athletes (track and field) at the 2006 Commonwealth Games
Athletes (track and field) at the 2007 Pan American Games
Commonwealth Games silver medallists for Canada
Athletes from Saskatoon
Commonwealth Games gold medallists for Canada
Athletes (track and field) at the 2014 Commonwealth Games
Athletes (track and field) at the 2015 Pan American Games
Commonwealth Games medallists in athletics
Pan American Games medalists in athletics (track and field)
Pan American Games gold medalists for Canada
Universiade medalists in athletics (track and field)
Universiade silver medalists for Canada
Canadian Track and Field Championships winners
Medalists at the 2007 Pan American Games
Medallists at the 2014 Commonwealth Games